Beach handball at the 2019 Southeast Asian Games was held at the Subic Tennis Court at the Subic Bay Freeport Zone between 7 and 11 December 2019.

It is the last medal event and only medal event in the final day of the games.

Medalists

Results

References

External links
 

2019 Southeast Asian Games events
Southeast Asian Games
Beach handball at multi-sport events